Quick is a 1932 German comedy film directed by Robert Siodmak and starring Lilian Harvey, Hans Albers and Paul Hörbiger. A separate French-language version was made, also directed by Siodmak and starring Harvey. The film is based on a play by Félix Gandéra. It was made by Germany's largest company UFA at the Babelsberg Studios, with sets by art director Erich Kettelhut. It premiered at the Ufa-Palast am Zoo. A separate French-language film Quick featuring Harvey was also produced.

Plot
A woman staying at a health spa, Lillian Harvey, goes to the theater every night to see "Quick" a comic performer, who wears clown make-up. She meets him off stage, without make-up and doesn't recognize him. He courts her, hoping she'll like him for himself but she maintains her crush on "Quick."

Cast
 Lilian Harvey as Eva Prätorius
 Hans Albers as Quick, Music Clown
 Paul Hörbiger as Lademann, Quick's manager
 Willy Stettner as Herr von Pohl, named Dicky
 Albert Kersten as Professor Bertram
 Karl Meinhardt as Direktor Henkel
 Paul Westermeier as Clock
 Genia Nikolaieva as Marion, dancer
 Käthe Haack as Frau Koch
 Flockina von Platen as Charlotte
 Fritz Odemar as Headwaiter

References

Bibliography

External links 
 

1932 films
1932 comedy films
German comedy films
1930s German-language films
Films directed by Robert Siodmak
UFA GmbH films
German multilingual films
Circus films
German black-and-white films
Films produced by Erich Pommer
1932 multilingual films
1930s German films
Films shot at Babelsberg Studios